Clemens Jöckle (15 April 1950 – 2 June 2014) was a German art historian. From 2001 to 2012, he was the director of the Städtische Galerie Speyer.

Life 
His career was bumpy at first.

Author and voluntary commitment 
Jöckle wrote several art books and compiled an encyclopaedia of saints. He wrote numerous monographs and brochures on artists and buildings as well as exhibition catalogues. For the Allgemeines Künstlerlexikon, he edited the Palatinate artists.

Jöckle endeavoured to promote art and artists and to contribute to the understanding of art. He appeared as a speaker at exhibition openings in Speyer and its environs at museums, art associations and galleries.

Director of the Municipal Gallery Speyer 
After a long political discussion, the gallery had been established in a building complex belonging to the city of Speyer, next to the Altes Stadtsaal, which was used as a children's and youth theatre and alternative cinema. Both buildings, located behind the old town hall, together with the Zimmertheater Speyer and the Winkeldruckerey, which were also located there, formed the so-called Kulturhof Speyer. The Städtische Galerie was run with professional opening hours, whereas many municipal galleries only opened by the day and then by the hour, and achieved maximum closing times of one week between exhibitions. Jöckle did not want a gallery with a bar; the focus was not to be on the encounter with the wine glass, but with art. Between its opening on 23 July 2001 and 2012, the gallery hosted almost a hundred exhibitions, including paintings by painters such as Marc Chagall, Henri Matisse and Antonio Saura as well as great Palatine painters such as Hans Purrmann, Anselm Feuerbach and Max Slevogt. After the fall of the Wall, Jöckle organised the first western exhibition of the young New Leipzig School. The gallery's basic programme consisted of a variety of thematic exhibitions, best-of exhibitions by young artists, anniversary exhibitions and, time and again, the presentation of otherwise inaccessible private collections.

Planned Wittelsbach Exhibition and death 

In July 2012, he was appointed by the Mainz Ministry of Culture to prepare the planned large Wittelsbach exhibition at Villa Ludwigshöhe Palace from the beginning of 2013. This did not happen due to a severe stroke in autumn 2012, as a result of which he died on 2 June 2014 at the age of 64.

Jöckle's grave is located in the Speyer cemetery. The designation FamOT on the gravestone means that Clemens Jöckle was a lay member of the Teutonic Order (Ordo Teutonicus).

Publications 
  – Bilder aus dem Leben einer Kleinstadt. Bezirksgruppe Speyer des Historischen Vereins der Pfalz 1978
 Kleine Chronik des Kunstvereins: Vom pfälzischen Kunstverein zum Kunstverein Speyer. Speyer 1980. 
 Wallfahrtsstätten im Bistum Speyer. 1983, 
 Der Maler Friedrich Jossé. Leben und Werk. Schnell u. Steiner, Munich [among others] 1987
  with Ambrosius Schneider, Werner Seeling uad Peter Roth: Otterberg. Kirche, Konfessionen, Geschichte. Evangelischer Presseverlag Pfalz, 1993
  (1948–1991). Das Schiff des Lebens oder die Kunst, einen Vorhang zu lüften. In Ludwigshafen <Landkreis>: Heimatjahrbuch. Vol. 10, 1994, 
 Das große Heiligenlexikon. K. Müller Verlag, Erlangen 1995, 
 with Josef Matheis: Markus Klammer (1963–1993). Leben und Werk. Josef Fink Verlag, Lindenberg 1996, 
 Das Narrenschiff am Abgrund. Zur Bildmetaphorik von Werner Holz. "Labyrinthische Bilderwelten" / [Kunstverein Bad Dürkheim]. Bad Dürkheim 1998.
 Memento Mori. Friedhöfe Europas. GLB Parkland, 1998, übersetzt ins Tschechische von Jana Zoubková
 100 Bauwerke in Frankfurt. , Regensburg 1998, 
 Pilgerstätten. Hundert Wunderstätten Europas. K. Müller Verlag, Erlangen 1999, 
 Mit der Farbe zeichnen. Heinrich von Zügel (1850–1941). Kunstverlag Josef Fink, Lindenberg 2001,  (also translated into Czech by Josef Matějů and into Dutch by Maarten Lekkerkerken).
 with Christopher Kerstjens von Fink: Mit Farbe und Linie. Elisabeth Mack-Usselmann. Kunstverlag Josef Fink, Lindenberg 2002, 
 with Heinz Setzer: Adolf Doerner (1892–1964). Leben und Werk. Kunstverlag Josef Fink, Lindenberg 2003, 
 with Christopher Kerstjens: Baustile der Weltarchitektur. Das Standardwerk der Baukunst von der Antike bis zur Gegenwart. 2006, von den Vorauflagen dieses Buches (Erstauflage 2001) existieren Übersetzungen so z.B. von Eszter Krisztina Aczél ins Ungarische oder ins Niederländische
 with Georg Denzler: Der Vatikan. Geschichte – Kunst – Bedeutung. Primus Verlag, Darmstadt 2006, 
 Der heilige Laurentius. Diakon und Märtyrer. Sadifa-Media, Kehl/Rhein 2008, 
 Der heilige Georg. Legende, Verehrung und Darstellungen. Der edle, leuchtende Stern aus Kappadozien. Sadifa-Media, Kehl/Rhein 2008, 
 Der Maler  – Leben und Werk. Verlag Giloi & Ultes, Winnweiler 2010, 
 Kloster St. Magdalena Speyer. Schnell-Kunstführer Nr. 1346, 1st edition, Munich 1983.
 with photos by Thomas Klenner, Horst Poggel: Dreifaltigkeitskirche Speyer. 5th edition, Schnell & Steiner, Regensburg 2011, 
 in collaboration with : Kiedrich im Rheingau. 13th edition, Schnell & Steiner, Regensburg 2011, 
 with Fotos von Renate J. Deckers-Matzko: St. Joseph, Speyer. 2nd edition, Schnell & Steiner, Regensburg 2011, 
 Memento mori. berühmte Friedhöfe Europas. Nebel-Verlag, Utting 2011,

References

External links 
about the person
 
 
 Beispiel für die Erklärung einer Statue von Clemens Jöckle: Der Speyerer Jakobspilger. Eine Bronzestatue von Martin Mayer
 Clemens Jöckle stellt die Arbeitsgemeinschaft Pfälzer Künstler (apk), die Technik der Radierung und sechs Künstler, die mit Radierungen arbeiten, mittels der Eröffnungsrede zur Ausstellung Meister der Ätztechniken beim Kulturkreis Sulzfeld vor. (PDF; 72 kB)

Video
 kurze Interviewsequenz mit Clemens Jöckle am Rande des Forum Kaiserdom am 15. März 2012 über dessen Vortrag zu den Umgestaltungsplänen der Nationalsozialisten für den Speyerer Kaiserdom ab ca. Sek. 48; Beitrag des OK Speyer; Kurzbericht von Wolfgang Schuch; auf YouTube retrieved 10 June 2014

German art historians
1950 births
2014 deaths
People from Alzenau
Directors of museums in Germany